= Anders Christian Hougård =

Danish politician

Anders Christian Hougård (born 1954, Jutland, Western Denmark) is the Danish Ambassador to Serbia.

When he finished his military service in 1975, Hougård served in the Danish Police from 1976 to 1992. While working for the police, he earned an MA in law from Aarhus University. He received an LLM (Master of Laws) from Harvard Law School.

He entered the foreign service in 1992 and was posted in Riyadh, Moscow, Islamabad and Saint Petersburg. In 2008, he was appointed an ambassador to Pakistan in 2008. He also served as ambassador in Tehran and Zagreb.
